Horseman or The Horsemen or variation, may refer to:

People
Horseman, a person who practices equestrianism

Occupations
Wrangler (profession), in the United States
Stockman (Australia), who works with horses rather than with cattle or sheep

Persons
Elaine Horseman (1925–1999), British author

Fictional characters
BoJack Horseman (character), protagonist of the television series BoJack Horseman

Places
Horseman, Wisconsin, unincorporated community

Groups and organizations
Royal Canadian Mounted Police
 The Mkhedrioni (Horsemen); a political group in Georgia, founded in 1989
 The Horsemen Aerobatic Team, a P-51 flying group
Four Horsemen of Notre Dame (American college football)
Brooklyn Lions / Horsemen (1926), a National Football League team that played in the 1926 NFL season

Arts and entertainment
The Horseman (opera) (Finnish: Ratsumies), a 1975 Finnish opera by Aulis Sallinen

Films
The Horsemen (1950 film), initial official overseas release title of Soviet film Brave People
The Horsemen (1971 film), starring Omar Sharif
Horseman (film), 2003 Croatian drama film directed by Branko Ivanda
The Horseman (film), 2008 Australian thriller directed and written by Steven Kastrissios
Horsemen (2009 film), 2009 American thriller film directed by Jonas Åkerlund
Horsemen (film), 2009 American thriller film directed by Jonas Åkerlund

Other uses
 The Four Horsemen of the Apocalypse (The Horsemen), harbingers of the end of days from the Book of Revelation
The Horseman, brand of cameras manufactured by Komamura Corporation

See also

 
 
Horsemaning (pose), a photographic pose
The Third Horseman (TV episode), 2002 season 1 episode 11 of Law&Order:Criminal Intent
The Fifth Horseman (disambiguation)
The Fourth Horseman (disambiguation)
Four Horsemen of the Apocalypse (disambiguation)
Headless Horseman (disambiguation)
Horse people (disambiguation)
Horse (disambiguation)